Hellerup station is a regional and S-train railway station]serving the district of Hellerup in Copenhagen, Denmark.

It is served by regional trains on the Coast Branch, as well as S-trains.

History

The station was designed by V.C.H. Wolf and opened on 22 July 1863, simultaneously with the start of service on the Klampenborg line. The station was among the first on Copenhagen's S-train network. The first S-train line (Klampenborg station to Vanløse station) included Hellerup station. This was in 1934 and the S-trains initially followed the northern path of today's F-line. Hellerup station was the fourth station from Klampenborg and the fourth from Vanløse. Since then the southern part of the F-line has a new path and several new stations have opened, all south of Hellerup.

Services

The regional train lines goes from Nivå station to Copenhagen Airport via the City Centre, and from Elsinore via the City Centre to Copenhagen Airport and further (as Øresund train ) to Scania and some other provinces in southern Sweden. Each hour, six regional trains depart in each direction, a frequency which matches that of most S-train lines, and is unique among regional railway lines in and around Copenhagen.

The station also serves Copenhagen's S-train lines A, C, E, and F services. For the latter line the station is its northern end station or terminus. Weekdays there are 60 S-train departures every hour. There are twelve departures on Line-F (with 5 minutes between departures), and six departures in each direction for the other three lines. This gives 72 departing regional and S-trains every hour from the station's five platform tracks. This doesn't quite reflect the number of passengers who use the station, but it is still a rather important station.

Hellerup station is located within Copenhagen municipality, but the immediate surroundings form the Hellerup borough of Gentofte municipality. Central Hellerup is near the station and is along the main roads built up of blocks with 4 to 5 floors. In the smaller streets many of Copenhagen's largest villas can be found and the Hellerup area is one of the richest in Denmark.

Cultural references
Hellerup station is seen at 1:24:10 in the 1975 Olsen-banden film The Olsen Gang on the Track.

See also
 List of railway stations in Denmark

References

External links

S-train (Copenhagen) stations
Railway stations in Copenhagen
Railway stations opened in 1863
Railway stations in Denmark opened in the 19th century